Urban Qawwali (Urban Quwali)(Urban Quwalli) is a genre of music that fuses Sufi devotional music popular from South Asia mixed with Urban beats from the west.

Urban Qawwali's first emerged in the 1990s with DJs mixing Hip-Hop beats with Vocals from Qawwals and popular Sufi singers like Nusrat Fateh Ali Khan & Sabri Brothers

One of the first DJs/Producers to mix both genres of music was Bally Sagoo who had a close connection with the great Nusrat Fateh Ali Khan and released the album Majic Touch in 1993

Since 1993 many DJs/Producers/Bands have experimented with the style such as:

Punjabi MC
Sukhshinda Shinda
Jinx
Pearl Jam
Shankar–Ehsaan–Loy
A R Rahman

References

External links
 OSA Records
 www.UrbanQuwali.com

Fusion music genres